A Fork in the Road is an Australian travel television series airing on SBS and hosted by Pria Viswalingam.

Described by SBS as "the thinking-person’s travel show" the program takes the viewer off the beaten track and takes a look at the lives of the people living in each destination rather than following the usual "travel show" format. The altogether 62 episodes had a length of ca. 25 minutes each.

Episodes in each series

Series 1
1992: Egypt, Tuscany, Scotland, Hong Kong, Rhône-Alpes (France) and New York.

Series 2
1993: Greece, Argentina, Indonesia, Zimbabwe, the Rhine Valley (Alsace, Germany & Switzerland) and San Francisco.

Series 3 
1994: Chicago, Paris, Sicily, Kerala (India), Malta and New Zealand.

Series 4
1995: New Orleans, Hungary (2 episodes), Marseilles, Rio de Janeiro and Malaysia.

Series 5
Washington D.C., Japan, Spain, Jamaica, Ireland (2 episodes).

Series 6 (A Fork in Australia) 
1999: Colours, Wheat, Clever Country, Friends & Lovers, Tourism, Food, The Cringe, The Pilgrimage .

Series 7 (A Fork in Asia) 
Tokyo/Hokkaidō, Delhi, Beijing, Nepal, Lebanon, Singapore, Guilin and Thailand.

Series 8 (A Fork in Africa) 
Tunisia, Kenya, Cape Town, Ethiopia, Madagascar, Zanzibar, Mali and Black Paris

Series 9 (A Fork in the Mediterranean)
2006: Venice, Barcelona, St. Tropez, Morocco, Kythera Island, Israel, Gibraltar, and Turkey.

External links
SBS: A Fork in the Road homepage

Fork in the Road, A
Australian non-fiction television series
Australian travel television series
1990s Australian television series
2000s Australian television series
1992 Australian television series debuts
2006 Australian television series endings